Leionema rotundifolium, is a dense shrub with needle-shaped stems and pale lemon to white terminal flowers. It is found in New South Wales and Queensland.

Description
The inflorescence is a rounded cluster of flowers on a short stem in the uppermost leaves or bracts. The calyx is shaped like an inverted cone, smooth and broadly triangular shaped. Flowering occurs from late winter to spring.

Taxonomy
This species was first formally described by Allan Cunningham and he gave it the name Eriostemon rotundifolius but did not publish the description. In 1837 Stephen Endlicher published Cunninghams description. In 1998 Paul G. Wilson changed the name to Leionema rotundifolium and published the description in Nuytsia.

Distribution and habitat
Leionema rotundifolium is found growing in the Torrington and Howell districts of north-eastern New South Wales and near Glen Aplin area of south-east Queensland on granite outcrops.

References

rotundifolium
Sapindales of Australia
Flora of New South Wales
Flora of Queensland
Taxa named by Paul G. Wilson